John Ambrose Watterson (May 27, 1844 – April 17, 1899) was an American prelate of the Catholic Church. He served as bishop of the Diocese of Columbus in Ohio from 1880 until his death in 1899.

Biography

Early life 
The sixth of eleven children, John Watterson was born on May 27, 1844, in Blairsville, Pennsylvania, to John Sylvester and Sarah Salome (née McAfee) Watterson. His father's family came to the United States from the Isle of Mann in the United Kingdom in 1762; originally Episcopalians, his grandfather was orphaned in 1781 and subsequently raised by a Catholic family in York County, Pennsylvania. His mother's family was from County Armagh, Ireland, and settled in Westmoreland County, Pennsylvania. John's parents frequently offered their home as a place of rest to traveling missionaries, and their house even became known as "The Priest's Hotel."

After attending the parochial school of Sts. Simon and Jude Parish in Blairsville, Watterson was sent to St. Vincent's College in Latrobe, Pennsylvania, at a young age, being in formation as a Benedictine monk for a time. In 1861, he entered Mount St. Mary's Seminary at Emmitsburg, Maryland, where he earned a Bachelor of Arts degree with high honors.

Priesthood 
Watterson was ordained to the priesthood for the Diocese of Columbus by Bishop Michael Domenec on August 9, 1868, at St. Vincent's Abbey in Latrobe. Watterson then served as professor of moral theology and Scripture at Mount St. Mary's, where he became vice president in 1877 and later president in 1879. He earned a Doctor of Divinity degree from Georgetown College in Washington, D.C. in June 1879.

Bishop of Columbus 
On March 14, 1880, Watterson was appointed the second bishop of the Diocese of Columbus by Pope Leo XIII. He received his episcopal consecration on August 8, 1880, from Archbishop William Elder, with Bishops William McCloskey and John Tuigg serving as co-consecrators. During his 19-year-long tenure, Watterson increased the number of priests and schools in the diocese, founded two hospitals and the Pontifical College Josephinum in Columbus, and erected many new missions and parishes. A strong proponent of temperance, he prohibited saloon owners from holding office in any Catholic organization in the diocese, and made all the children to whom he administered confirmation promise not to drink until they were 21. He was the first Catholic bishop ever to speak at Ohio State University in Columbus

John Watterson died in Columbus unexpectedly on April 17, 1899, at age 54. He is buried at Mount Calvary Cemetery in Columbus. Bishop Watterson High School is named in his honor. He is also one of the featured persons of the Washington Gladden Social Justice Park in downtown Columbus.

References

1844 births
1899 deaths
People from Indiana County, Pennsylvania
Saint Vincent College alumni
Mount St. Mary's University alumni
Georgetown College (Georgetown University) alumni
Roman Catholic bishops of Columbus
19th-century Roman Catholic bishops in the United States
American people of Irish descent
American people of Manx descent
Burials at Mount Calvary Cemetery (Columbus, Ohio)
Catholics from Pennsylvania